Luiz Carlos Prates (born January 26, 1943 in Santiago do Brasil) is a Brazilian journalist, psychologist, and radio sport announcer.

Biography 

Born in Santiago do Brasil on January 26, 1943, he lived for seven years on a nearby ranch before moving to Santa Maria, where he spent his adolescence.

He began his career in the '60s as a sports announcer for Rádio Porto Alegre. The following year he moved to Rádio Difusora and then to Rádio Guaíba. Between 1964 and 1969 he was a correspondent in Brazil for the U.S. Voz América.

He graduated in psychology in the '70s at the Pontifical Catholic University of Rio Grande do Sul.

He was a television sports announcer for four World Cup tournaments from 1978 to 1990.

In 1981, he moved to Criciúma and later to Florianópolis, in the State of Santa Catarina, where he worked on Record TV and Eldorado TV. In 1983, he became a coordinator of sports RBS TV, where he was an announcer and commentator on soccer matches. Famous for his right-wing political views, he has received several threats for his controversial comments. In one of them, he described Lula's government as "... miserable ...". In 2009, he defended the military-led government of 1964–85.

He is known in television for a particular gesture that keeps the average viewer.

From 2018 he works with RIC Group.

References

External links 
 

1943 births
Brazilian journalists
Brazilian psychologists
Brazilian radio personalities
Living people